"Waterfront Fists" is a Sailor Steve Costigan short story by Robert E. Howard.  It was originally published in the September 1930 issue of Fight Stories. Howard earned $90 for the sale of this story which is now in the public domain.

It is also known by the title "Stand Up and Slug" since being published in the Summer 1940 issue of Fight Stories under the pseudonym Mark Adams.

References

External links

 List of stories and publication details at Howard Works

Short stories by Robert E. Howard
Pulp stories
1930 short stories
Short stories about boxing
Works originally published in Fight Stories